Gilles Gratton (born July 28, 1952 in LaSalle, Quebec) is a Canadian former professional ice hockey goaltender.

Playing career
As a youth, Gratton played in the 1965 Quebec International Pee-Wee Hockey Tournament with a minor ice hockey team from LaSalle, Quebec.

Gratton began his junior hockey career in 1969 with the Oshawa Generals of the Ontario Hockey Association; after three years in Oshawa, Gratton was drafted in the fifth round of the 1972 NHL Amateur Draft by the Buffalo Sabres. Instead of signing with Buffalo (where his brother, Norm Gratton, would soon be playing after his acquisition from the Atlanta Flames), Gilles jumped to the new World Hockey Association, inking a deal with the Ottawa Nationals; in 1973, Gratton would move with the team to Toronto, as the franchise became the Toronto Toros. At the 1974 Summit Series, Gratton was selected as Team Canada's number three goaltender, seeing action in warm-up games against Finland and Czechoslovakia, and very briefly in Game Three of the series against the Soviet Union.

In 1975, Gratton jumped to the St. Louis Blues of NHL, but after just six games decided he wanted to go back to Toronto and walked out on the team. However, the Blues refused to grant him his release, so he sat out the rest of the season. They relented during the summer and Gratton wound up with the New York Rangers, splitting time in goal with John Davidson. Finally, Gratton played one game with the minor-league New Haven Nighthawks in the 1977–78 AHL season before retiring.

Gratton is perhaps best known for his goalie mask, which was an adaptation of his astrological sign, Leo. However, Gratton states that he got the idea from a picture in a National Geographic magazine that he was reading on a plane flight, stating, "It's not a lion mask at all. It's a tiger." Allegedly, Gratton would live up to his "feline" image by growling at opposing players on the ice, and even hissing like a cat during a fight.

"Gratoony the Loony"
Throughout his career, Gratton, nicknamed "Gratoony the Loony", was known for his eccentric personality and outspoken character, often drawing attention away from his talent. While playing in the WHA, he once hurled insults against the opposing team's fans in San Diego ahead of a playoff game. Legend has it that Gratton once told his teammates he was reincarnated and had once been a soldier in the Spanish Inquisition. Gratton also allegedly believed that, in a previous existence, he was an executioner who had stoned people to death, and thus was "fated" to be a goalie as punishment. While with the Toros, he refused to play because the moon was in the wrong part of the sky, thereby not lined up with Jupiter. He later stated he did so to protest against the firing of coach Billy Harris.

On THN.com, he was voted to have the sixth-scariest goalie mask.

Today
In October 2015, ECW Press announced that it would be publishing Gratton's autobiography, Grattoony the Loony, written with author Greg Oliver.

Career statistics

Regular season and playoffs

International

References

External links
 
 Gratton's goalie mask

1952 births
Living people
Buffalo Sabres draft picks
Canadian ice hockey goaltenders
French Quebecers
Ice hockey people from Montreal
New Haven Nighthawks players
New York Rangers players
Oshawa Generals players
Ottawa Nationals players
People from LaSalle, Quebec
St. Louis Blues players
Toronto Toros players